This is a list of diseases of cineraria (Pericallis × hybrida).

Bacterial diseases

Fungal diseases

Nematodes, parasitic

Viral and viroid diseases

Phytoplasmal diseases

References
Common Names of Diseases, The American Phytopathological Society

Cineraria